Daithí Casey (born March 1990) is an Irish Gaelic footballer who plays for club side Dr. Crokes. He has also lined out with University College Cork and at inter-county level with the Kerry senior football team. He usually lines out in the forwards.

Honours

University College Cork
Sigerson Cup: 2011

Dr. Crokes
All-Ireland Senior Club Football Championship: 2017
Munster Senior Club Football Championship: 2011, 2012, 2013, 2016, 2018
Kerry Senior Football Championship: 2010, 2011, 2012, 2013, 2016, 2017, 2018

Kerry
All-Ireland Senior Football Championship: 2014
Munster Senior Football Championship: 2011, 2014, 2015, 2018
Munster Minor Football Championship: 2008

References

External link

 Daithí Casey profile at the Terrace Talk website

1990 births
Living people
Dr Crokes Gaelic footballers
Irish schoolteachers
Kerry inter-county Gaelic footballers
UCC Gaelic footballers